St. Theresa's Cathedral may refer to:

 St. Theresa's Cathedral, Caxias do Sul, Brazil
 St. Teresa of Avila Cathedral, Amos, Quebec, Canada
 St. Theresa's Cathedral, Changchun, China
 St. Theresa of the Child Jesus Cathedral, Urawa, Japan
 St. Theresa of Avila Cathedral, Subotica, Serbia
 St. Theresa Cathedral, Juba, South Sudan
 Co-Cathedral of Saint Theresa of the Child Jesus (Honolulu, Hawaii), United States

See also 
 St. Theresa Church (disambiguation)